The Battle of Niš was fought on 24 September 1689, near the city of Niš in southern Serbia, between the forces of the Ottoman Empire, and the forces of the Holy Roman Empire as part of the Great Turkish War.

The Austrian Commander, Louis William, Margrave of Baden-Baden; defeated the Ottoman forces and captured the city. When Louis William learned that there are no Ottoman defence positions on Vinik he ordered Nestorović to attack it. Nestorović managed to bypass right wing of Ottoman forces and with this maneuver solved the battle in favor of Austrians. For this achievement, after this battle Nestorović was promoted to the rank of Lieutenant.

After the battle Louis left Lieutenant-general Piccolomini in charge of the Sanjak of Niš and marched to Vidin, where he attacked the Ottoman garrison on 14 October and received its capitulation on 19 October. Piccolomini led a campaign deep into Macedonia. The Ottomans retook Niš the following September after the Austrian abandoned the city.

See also 
Fire of Skopje 1689
Karposh's Rebellion

References

Sources 
 
 

Battles of the Great Turkish War
Battles involving the Ottoman Empire
Battles involving the Holy Roman Empire
Conflicts in 1689
1689 in Europe
1689 in the Ottoman Empire
17th century in Serbia
Battle of Niš (1689)